Marina Orlova (born 25 March 1986) is a Russian actress. To her credit she has 40 film and television roles. Orlova currently resides in Los Angeles.

Biography 
Her debut took place in 1995 at the Theater of Musical Comedy. While still a student of Boris Shchukin Theatre Institute she was noticed by film director Tatyana Voronetskaya and was invited to star in the historical melodrama "The Model" which was selected in the competition program of the 18th Film Festival Kinotavr.

The following year, she was invited to play a starring role of Svetlana in the film "Blockhead" (Ohlamon) where she also sang. The actress became popular in 2008 after the release of a family saga "Dear people" on the TV channel Russia 1, in which she starred as Olga. The show was extended for another 200 episodes.

Orlova was also noticed by Stanislav Govorukhin, who at that time was already in the process of filming the movie "The Passenger", but has added the role of Nina Markovna specifically for Orlova. The film won the main prize "Big Golden Bark" at the festival "Window to Europe" in Vyborg and other awards. Subsequently Orlova starred in several other Govorukhin's films, including the detective film Weekend.

Since 2009 Orlova has been active abroad as an actress. Chinese director Yu Xiao Gan offered Marina Orlova, a main role in the film "The Last Secrets of the Master"(猎人笔记之谜). Also one of the musical themes of the film was written by Orlova. This role made her gain popularity in Asian countries.

In 2014 Orlova got the main role in Hollywood film "White crows". She stars with Eric Roberts in the film about Frank Sinatra "Frank and Ava". After this role Marina becomes a member of Hollywood actors guild SAG-Aftra. In Europe and Asia, she stars in films, plays at the theater, works as a model with Russian and Italian designers, as well as participates in concerts with her songs. She performed on the stage of Grand Kremlin Palace with the Caruso song accompanied by an orchestra of Naples and Italian singer Renzo Arbore, also she toured in Russia with her own songs.

During her film career Orlova has played about 40 roles in films, has written approximately 80 songs, some of which can be heard in the movies where she starred, she is also a producer of two films, and screenwriter of one picture.

Italian short film in English, Hello! I'm the producer of Woody Allen is entirely produced by Orlova, in which she worked as a script writer, producer, composer and actress. The film was selected for the competition program of 38 Moscow International Film Festival. The film was recognized as the best short Italian film and won the Grand Prix, Leonardo da Vinci Gold Horse, at the International Film Festival in Milan.

In addition to film and music works, Orlova is known as a TV and radio host of several programs. 

She was appointed a Goodwill Ambassador for the Italian charity organization "Maria Diomira", with the support of the Vatican, in a program to help children in Kenya and the construction of the school of arts.

Filmography 
 2016 Hello! I'm a Producer of Woody Allen as Christina
 2016 Headgame
 2014 The Treehouse
 2014 White Crows
 2013  as singer Mary
 2013 Not So Young
 2012  (TV Series) as Barbie
 2011 Always Say Always 7 (TV Series) as Liza
 2011 The Golds. Barvikha 2 (TV Series) as Tatiana Lipkina
 2010 Interns (Episode 6)
 2010  (TV Series) as Svetlana, a three-day temporary secretary in the editorial "MF" (Season 2), with 219 Series – assistant in the department of "Fashion" (Season 3)
 2010 The last secret of the Master (TV Series) as Elena
 2009  (TV Series) as Nika Samokhina
 2009 | as Olya
 2009  (TV Series) as Tatiana (Tanya) Lipkina
 2008 Hipsters as Komsomolka (uncredited)
 2008 Urgent Room 2 as Tatiana
 2008 Relatives (TV Series Ukraine) as Olga Kuznetsova
 2008 Cursed Paradise 2 (TV Series) as Roza
 2008  as Nina Markovna
 2008 Visyak (TV Series) as Olya
 2007 The Matchmaker (TV Series) as Nastya
 2007 All the boys are calls Kostya
 2007  as Sveta
 2007 The Art Model (film) as Anna
 2007 Gromovy. House of Hope (TV Series) as translator Larissa
 2004 Samara-gorodok (TV Mini-Series) as student

References

External links 
 
 http://marinaorlova.film

1986 births
Living people
People from Pyatigorsk
Russian film actresses
Russian television actresses
Russian stage actresses
Russian television presenters
Russian radio personalities
21st-century Russian singers
21st-century Russian women singers
Russian women television presenters